Mihai Alexandru Roman (born 31 May 1992) is a Romanian professional footballer who plays mainly as a striker for Liga I club FC Botoșani.

International career

Roman played for Romania at the 2011 UEFA European Under-19 Championship.

On 10 September 2013, he scored twice for the under-21 team in a game against Montenegro.

International stats

Honours
Pandurii Târgu Jiu
Cupa Ligii runner-up: 2014–15

Universitatea Craiova
Cupa României: 2020–21
Supercupa României: 2021

External links
 
 

1992 births
Living people
Sportspeople from Craiova
Romanian footballers
Association football forwards
FC U Craiova 1948 players
FC Petrolul Ploiești players
FC Universitatea Cluj players
CS Turnu Severin players
AFC Săgeata Năvodari players
CS Pandurii Târgu Jiu players
NEC Nijmegen players
Maccabi Petah Tikva F.C. players
CS Universitatea Craiova players
ACS Poli Timișoara players
FC Botoșani players
Liga I players
Eredivisie players
Israeli Premier League players
Romanian expatriate footballers
Expatriate footballers in the Netherlands
Romanian expatriate sportspeople in the Netherlands
Expatriate footballers in Israel
Romanian expatriate sportspeople in Israel
Romania youth international footballers
Romania under-21 international footballers
Romania international footballers